Veronica syriaca, the Syrian speedwell, is a flowering plant species in the family Plantaginaceae. The generic name of this flower is of unknown origin. Some think it is a distortion of betonica, the Latin name of a species of Labiates; others consider that it refers to Saint Veronica who handed a cloth to Christ to wipe the perspiration from his face.

Description
Annual. pubescent-glandular, 10–30 cm. Leaves ovate, crenulate or dentate.
Flowers in loose racemes. Bracts linear, entire. Pedicels filiform, spreading-erect, sometimes recurved at apex. Calyx lobes ovate-Ianceolate, 2–3 mm. Corolla blue and white, 8–15 mm in diameter.

Flowering
January–May.

Distribution and habitat

Fields, gardens. Coast, lower and middle mountains, eastern slope, Beqaa of Lebanon, Hennon.
Syria and Lebanon, Israel, Egypt, Iraq, Turkey.

References

Georges Tohme& Henriette Tohme, IIIustrated Flora of Lebanon, National Council For Scientific Research, Second Edition 2014.

syriaca
Flora of Egypt
Flora of Iraq
Flora of Lebanon and Syria
Flora of Palestine (region)
Flora of Turkey